Pini may refer to:

People

Surname 
Anthony Pini (Carlos Antonio Pini; 1902–1989), Argentinian cellist, soloist, orchestral section leader and chamber musician
Antonio Pini-Corsi (1858(?)–1918), Italian operatic baritone
Carolina Pini (1988–), Italian soccer player
Ermenegildo Pini (1739–1825), Italian clergyman, naturalist, mathematician, geologist and philosopher
Giorgio Pini (1899–1987), Italian politician and journalist
Giovanni Pini (1992–), Italian professional basketball player
Karen Pini (Karen Jo Pini; 1957–), first runner-up at the 1976 Miss World pageant
Lucila Pini (1930-1974), Brazilian sprinter
Marcela Pini (1972-), Uruguayan activist and psychologist
Matt Pini (Matthew James Pini; 1969–), Australian-born Italian naturalized rugby union player
Napoleone Pini (1835-1907), Italian zoologist and palaeontologist
Rodolfo Pini (1926–2000), Uruguayan footballer
Ryan Pini (1981–), 3-time Olympic swimmer from Papua New Guinea
Tiziana Pini (1958–), Italian actress and television personality
Wendy and Richard Pini (1951– and 1950–), creators of the Elfquest series
Yoav Pini Jarafi (born 1993), Israeli footballer who plays as goalkeeper

Given name 
Pinhas "Pini" Badash (1952–), Israeli politician
Pini Balili (born 1979), Israeli footballer
Pinchas "Pini" Ben-Porat (1914-1955), one of Israel's first aviators
Pinchas Eliezer "Pini" Dunner (born 1970), orthodox rabbi living in Beverly Hills, CA 
Pini Gershon (born 1951), Israeli basketball player and coach
Pini Shomer (1951–), Israeli former politician
Pinhas "Pini" Zahavi (1955–), Israeli football agent

Other uses 
Pini (web series), the 2010 web series that was broadcast on Ynet
Pini, a village in Victor Vlad Delamarina Commune, Timiș County, Romania
Pini, one of the Batu Islands
Poggio dei Pini, in south-west Sardinia, Italy
a spurious language, part of the Western Desert language, dialect cluster of Australian Aboriginal languages in the Pama–Nyungan family